Leïla Slimani (born 3 October 1981) is a Franco-Moroccan writer and journalist. She is also a French diplomat in her capacity as the personal representative of the French president Emmanuel Macron to the Organisation internationale de la Francophonie. In 2016 she was awarded the Prix Goncourt for her novel Chanson douce.

Life
Slimani's maternal grandmother Anne Dhobb (née Ruetsch, born 1921) grew up in Alsace. In 1944 she met her future husband Lakhdar Dhobb, a Moroccan colonel in the French Colonial Army, during the liberation of France. After the war she followed him back to Morocco, where they lived in Meknes. Her autobiographical novel was published in 2003; she became the first writer in the family. Her daughter - Slimani's mother - is Béatrice-Najat Dhobb-Slimani, an otolaryngologist, who married the French-educated Moroccan economist Othman Slimani. The couple had three daughters; Leïla Slimani is the middle one. Leïla was born in Rabat on 3 October 1981; she grew up in a liberal, French-speaking household and attended French schools. An important rupture in Slimani's childhood occurred in 1993 when her father was falsely implicated in a finance scandal and fired from his position as president of the CIH Bank (he was later officially exonerated.)

Slimani left Morocco at the age of 17 for Paris to study political science and media studies at the Sciences Po and ESCP Europe. After her graduation she temporarily considered a career as an actress, completing an acting course and appearing in supporting roles in two films. She married her husband, a Parisian banker whom she met first in 2005, on 24 April 2008 and started to work as a journalist for the magazine Jeune Afrique in October of that year. The work required much travel. After her son was born in 2011 and she got arrested in Tunisia while reporting on the Arab Spring, she decided to quit her job at Jeune Afrique to pursue freelance work and write a novel instead. The novel, however, was rejected by publishers. In 2013 Slimani took a writing workshop by Jean-Marie Laclavetine, a novelist and editor at Gallimard. He took an interest in Slimani's writing and helped her improve her style; in 2014 Slimani published her first novel Dans le jardin de l’ogre ("In the Garden of the Ogre" - in English translation, "Adèle") with Gallimard. The novel fared well with French critics and received the La Mamounia literary award in Morocco. Two years later she followed up with the psychological thriller Chanson douce, which won the Prix Goncourt and turned her into a literary star in France, and made her known to international audiences as well. In 2017 her second child, a daughter, was born.
In addition to her native Moroccan citizenship, Slimani also holds French citizenship due to her Alsatian heritage. In 2017, she was made an Officier of the Ordre des Arts et des Lettres by the French government.

In August 2022, she was announced as the chair of judges for the International Booker Prize 2023.

Work

Politics 
On 6 November 2017, the president of France Emmanuel Macron appointed Leila Slimani his personal representative to the Organisation internationale de la Francophonie.

Fiction

Adèle
Slimani's first novel Dans le jardin de l’ogre, published in English as Adèle, tells the story of a woman who loses control of her life due to her sexual addiction. Slimani got the idea for her story after seeing the Dominique Strauss-Kahn unfolding news. The novel fared well with French critics; in Morocco it received the La Mamounia literary award.

Lullaby/The Perfect Nanny

Chanson douce (lit. "sweet song") is the story of a double murder of two young siblings by their nanny, inspired by the killing by a nanny of the Krim children in Manhattan in 2012. The novel starts off with the immediate aftermath of the murder, and then recounts the backstory of the parents, a liberal, upper middle class Parisian couple, as well as their nanny, who is economically and psychologically struggling. Slimani named the nanny Louise after Louise Woodward, a British au pair in the US who was convicted of involuntary manslaughter of the toddler in her care. The novel was well received by French critics. It quickly turned into a bestseller, with over 76,000 copies printed within three months even before the book was awarded the Prix Goncourt in 2016. It subsequently became the  most read book in France that year with over 450,000 copies printed; by the end of 2017 around 600,000 copies had been sold in France. It has been translated into 18 languages, with 17 more to come; the English translation (by Sam Taylor) of her novel was published in 2018 as The Perfect Nanny in the US  and as Lullaby in the UK.  In 2019, Lullaby won a British Book Award in the "Début Book of the Year" category.

Le pays des autres

Le pays des autres, lit. "The country of the others" (at Gallimard, 2020), a first novel in a planned trilogy about the writer's own family, deals with the life of Slimani's maternal grandparents during Morocco's period of decolonisation in the 1950s. The second volume in the trilogy, Regardez-nous danser (lit. "Look at us dance"), was published in 2022.

Non-fiction
Slimani worked for several years as a journalist reporting on Northern Africa and the Maghreb, covering, among other things, the Arab Spring in 2011.

Her book Sexe et Mensonges: La Vie Sexuelle au Maroc ("Sex and Lies: Sex Life in Morocco") compiles the accounts of many women she had interviewed while on a book tour throughout Morocco.

La baie de Dakhla : itinérance enchantée entre mer et désert describes a region of Morocco on the Atlantic where people are going through a period of transition between traditional life and modernity.

Books

English edition: Adele: A Novel, translated by Sam Taylor, Penguin, 2019 

US edition: 
UK edition: 

Sexe et mensonges : La vie sexuelle au Maroc. Les Arènes, Paris, 2017 
UK edition: 
Paroles d'honneur. Les Arènes, Paris, 2017, illustrated by Laetitia Coryn
Le pays des autres. Gallimard, March 2020, in French
UK edition: The country of others.  Translated by Sam Taylor.  Faber & Faber. 2022.  ISBN 978-0571361632
US edition: In the country of others.  Penguin Books. 2022.  ISBN 978-0143135982
Regardez-nous danser. Gallimard, February 2022, in French

References

External links 

 Leïla Slimani : rencontre avec la romancière de l’ultramoderne solitude des femmes - Interview with Slimani (French)
NPR stories about Leila Slimani
Leila Slimani - BBC interview (audio, 9 mins)
Call for a Crime - Opening Speech of the 21st international literature festival berlin

1981 births
Living people
21st-century French novelists
21st-century French women writers
21st-century Moroccan women writers
French women novelists
Moroccan women novelists
Moroccan novelists
People from Rabat
Prix Goncourt winners
Sciences Po alumni
Moroccan secularists
Moroccan feminists
Alumni of Lycée Descartes (Rabat)
ESCP Europe alumni
Cours Florent alumni
Officiers of the Ordre des Arts et des Lettres